The Norway women's national under-20 volleyball team represents Norway in international women's volleyball competitions and friendly matches under the age 20 and it is ruled by the Norwegian Volleyball Federation That is an affiliate of Federation of International Volleyball FIVB and also a part of European Volleyball Confederation CEV.

Results

FIVB U20 World Championship
 Champions   Runners up   Third place   Fourth place

Europe U19 Championship
 Champions   Runners up   Third place   Fourth place

Team

Previous squad
The Following Players Represents Norway in the 2022 Women's U19 Volleyball European Championship Qualification

References

External links
Norwegian Volleyball Federation

V
National women's under-20 volleyball teams
Volleyball in Norway